Surf Taco is a chain of Mexican-Californian cuisine-style restaurants located primarily in the Jersey Shore area. The food served is also described as Coastal Cuisine. It was founded by Robert Nagel, in 2001. There are presently fourteen restaurants.

Main categories of food include:  tacos, burritos, wraps, smoothies, salads, quesadillas, side kicks (extra chips and salsa, chicken fingers, etc.), and "tsunamis" which are oversized burritos of grilled chicken, rice, beans, jack & cheddar cheeses, lettuce, sour cream, & salsa wrapped in two extra large flour tortillas, served wet topped with guacamole, sour cream & Pico de Gallo.

In 2009, the New York Times called the food "cross-generationally irresistible."

Surf Taco distributed bumper stickers advertising the restaurant. Because the bumper stickers were frequently posted on public property, the then Mayor of Belmar, Ken Pringle  was quoted in The Washington Times  stating that he had considered passing a law holding the distributors responsible for removing the stickers.

References

External links 
 Official website

Restaurants in New Jersey
Mexican restaurants in the United States
Restaurants established in 2001